In numerical analysis, polynomial interpolation is the interpolation of a given data set by the polynomial of lowest possible degree that passes through the points of the dataset. 

Given a set of  data points , with no two  the same, a polynomial function  is said to interpolate the data if  for each .

Two common explicit formulas for this polynomial are the Lagrange polynomials and Newton polynomials.

Applications 
Polynomials can be used to approximate complicated curves, for example, the shapes of letters in typography, given a few points. A relevant application is the evaluation of the natural logarithm and trigonometric functions: pick a few known data points, create a lookup table, and interpolate between those data points. This results in significantly faster computations. Polynomial interpolation also forms the basis for algorithms in numerical quadrature and numerical ordinary differential equations and Secure Multi Party Computation, Secret Sharing schemes.

Polynomial interpolation is also essential to perform sub-quadratic multiplication and squaring such as Karatsuba multiplication and Toom–Cook multiplication, where an interpolation through points on a polynomial which defines the product yields the product itself. For example, given a = f(x) = a0x0 + a1x1 + ... and b = g(x) = b0x0 + b1x1 + ..., the product ab is equivalent to W(x) = f(x)g(x). Finding points along W(x) by substituting x for small values in f(x) and g(x) yields points on the curve. Interpolation based on those points will yield the terms of W(x) and subsequently the product ab. In the case of Karatsuba multiplication this technique is substantially faster than quadratic multiplication, even for modest-sized inputs. This is especially true when implemented in parallel hardware.

Interpolation theorem
There exists a unique polynomial of degree at most  that interpolates the  data points , where no two  are the same. 

Equivalently, for a fixed choice of interpolation nodes , polynomial interpolation defines a linear bijection between the n-tuples of real-number values  and the vector space  of real polynomials of degree at most :

This is a type of unisolvence theorem. The theorem is also valid over any infinite field in place of the real numbers , for example the rational or complex numbers.

First proof
Consider the Lagrange basis functions given by

Notice that  is a polynomial of degree . Furthermore, for each  we have , where  is the Kronecker delta. It follows that the linear combination

is an interpolating polynomial of degree .

To prove uniqueness, assume that there exists another interpolating polynomial  of degree at most . Since  for all , it follows that the polynomial  has  distinct zeros. However,  is of degree at most  and, by the fundamental theorem of algebra, can have at most  zeros; therefore, .

Second proof
Write out the interpolation polynomial in the form

Substituting this into the interpolation equations , we get a system of linear equations in the coefficients , which reads in matrix-vector form as the following multiplication:

An interpolant  corresponds to a solution  of the above matrix equation .  The matrix X on the left is a Vandermonde matrix, whose determinant is known to be  which is non-zero since the nodes  are all distinct. This ensures that the matrix is invertible and the equation has the unique solution ; that is,  exists and is unique.

Corollary

Constructing the interpolation polynomial

The Vandermonde matrix in the second proof above may have large condition number, causing large errors when computing the coefficients  if the system of equations is solved using Gaussian elimination.

Several authors have therefore proposed algorithms which exploit the structure of the Vandermonde matrix to compute numerically stable solutions in O(n2) operations instead of the O(n3) required by Gaussian elimination. These methods rely on constructing first a Newton interpolation of the polynomial and then converting it to the monomial form above.

Alternatively, we may write down the polynomial immediately in terms of Lagrange polynomials:

For matrix arguments, this formula is called Sylvester's formula and the matrix-valued Lagrange polynomials are the Frobenius covariants.

Non-Vandermonde solutions
We are trying to construct our unique interpolation polynomial in the vector space Πn of polynomials of degree . When using a monomial basis for Πn we have to solve the Vandermonde matrix to construct the coefficients  for the interpolation polynomial. This can be a very costly operation (as counted in clock cycles of a computer trying to do the job). By choosing another basis for Πn we can simplify the calculation of the coefficients but then we have to do additional calculations when we want to express the interpolation polynomial in terms of a monomial basis.

One method is to write the interpolation polynomial in the Newton form and use the method of divided differences to construct the coefficients, e.g. Neville's algorithm. The cost is O(n2) operations, while Gaussian elimination costs O(n3) operations. Furthermore, you only need to do O(n) extra work if an extra point is added to the data set, while for the other methods, you have to redo the whole computation.

Another method is to use the Lagrange form of the interpolation polynomial. The resulting formula immediately shows that the interpolation polynomial exists under the conditions stated in the above theorem. Lagrange formula is to be preferred to Vandermonde formula when we are not interested in computing the coefficients of the polynomial, but in computing the value of p(x) in a given x not in the original data set. In this case, we can reduce complexity to O(n2).

The Bernstein form was used in a constructive proof of the Weierstrass approximation theorem by Bernstein and has gained great importance in computer graphics in the form of Bézier curves.

Linear combination of the given values 
The Lagrange form of the interpolating polynomial is a linear combination of the given values. In many scenarios, an efficient and convenient polynomial interpolation is a linear combination of the given values, using previously known coefficients. Given a set of  data points  where each data point is a (position, value) pair and where no two positions  are the same, the interpolation polynomial in the Lagrange form is a linear combination

of the given values  with each coefficient  given by evaluating the corresponding Lagrange basis polynomial using the given  positions .

Each coefficient  in the linear combination depends on the given positions  and the desired position , but not on the given values . Thus the same coefficient expressions  can be used in a polynomial interpolation of a given second set of  data points  at the same given positions , where the second given values  differ from the first given values . Using the same coefficient expressions  as for the first set of data points, the interpolation polynomial of the second set of data points is the linear combination

For each coefficient  in the linear combination, the expression resulting from the Lagrange basis polynomial  only depends on the relative spaces between the given positions, not on the individual value of any position. Thus the same coefficient expressions  can be used in a polynomial interpolation of a given third set of  data points

Using the same coefficient expressions  as for the first set of data points, the interpolation polynomial of the third set of data points is the linear combination

In many applications of polynomial interpolation, the given set of  data points is at equally spaced positions. In this case, it can be convenient to define the x-axis of the positions such that . For example, a given set of 3 equally-spaced data points  is then .

The interpolation polynomial in the Lagrange form is the linear combination

This quadratic interpolation is valid for any position x, near or far from the given positions. So, given 3 equally-spaced data points at  defining a quadratic polynomial, at an example desired position , the interpolated value after simplification is given by 

This is a quadratic interpolation typically used in the Multigrid method. Again given 3 equally-spaced data points at  defining a quadratic polynomial, at the next equally spaced position , the interpolated value after simplification is given by

In the above polynomial interpolations using a linear combination of the given values, the coefficients were determined using the Lagrange method. In some scenarios, the coefficients can be more easily determined using other methods. Examples follow.

According to the method of finite differences, for any polynomial of degree d or less, any sequence of  values at equally spaced positions has a th difference exactly equal to 0. The element sd+1 of the Binomial transform is such a th difference. This area is surveyed here. The binomial transform, T, of a sequence of values {vn}, is the sequence {sn} defined by

Ignoring the sign term , the  coefficients of the element sn are the respective  elements of the row n of Pascal's Triangle. The triangle of binomial transform coefficients is like Pascal's triangle. This results in the following example rows n = 0 through n = 7, top to bottom, for the BTC triangle:

For convenience, each row n of the above example BTC triangle also has a label . Thus for any polynomial of degree d or less, any sequence of  values at equally spaced positions has a linear combination result of 0, when using the  elements of row d as the corresponding linear coefficients.

For example, 4 equally spaced data points of a quadratic polynomial obey the linear equation given by row  of the BTC triangle.  This is the same linear equation as obtained above using the Lagrange method.

The BTC triangle can also be used to derive other polynomial interpolations. For example, the above quadratic interpolation

can be derived in 3 simple steps as follows. First, the row  spans the given and desired data points  with the linear equation

Second, the unwanted data point  is replaced by an expression in terms of wanted data points. The row  provides a linear equation with a term , which results in a term  by multiplying both sides of the linear equation by 4.

Similar to other uses of linear equations, the above derivation scales and adds vectors of coefficients. In polynomial interpolation as a linear combination of values, the elements of a vector correspond to a contiguous sequence of regularly spaced positions. The p non-zero elements of a vector are the p coefficients in a linear equation obeyed by any sequence of p data points from any degree d polynomial on any regularly spaced grid, where d is noted by the subscript of the vector. For any vector of coefficients, the subscript obeys . When adding vectors with various subscript values, the lowest subscript applies for the resulting vector.

Similarly, the cubic interpolation typical in the Multigrid method,

can be derived by a vector calculation starting with the vector of row  and the vector of row  of the BTC triangle.

Interpolation error

When interpolating a given function f by a polynomial of degree  at the nodes x0,...,xn we get the error

where

is the notation for divided differences.

The above error bound suggests choosing the interpolation points  such that the product  is as small as possible. The Chebyshev nodes achieve this.

Proof 
Set the error term as

and set up an auxiliary function:

where

From Rolle's theorem,  has at least  roots, then  has at least one root , where  is in the interval .

So we can get

Since  is a polynomial of degree at most , then

Thus

Therefore,

Thus the remainder term in the Lagrange form of the Taylor theorem is a special case of interpolation error when all interpolation nodes  are identical. Note that the error will be zero when  for any i. Thus, the maximum error will occur at some point in the interval between two successive nodes.

For equally spaced intervals

Thus the error bound can be given as

That question is treated in the section Convergence properties.

Lebesgue constants

We fix the interpolation nodes x0, ..., xn and an interval [a, b] containing all the interpolation nodes. The process of interpolation maps the function f to a polynomial p. This defines a mapping X from the space C([a, b]) of all continuous functions on [a, b] to itself. The map X is linear and it is a projection on the subspace Πn of polynomials of degree n or less.

The Lebesgue constant L is defined as the operator norm of X. One has (a special case of Lebesgue's lemma):

In other words, the interpolation polynomial is at most a factor (L + 1) worse than the best possible approximation. This suggests that we look for a set of interpolation nodes that makes L small. In particular, we have for Chebyshev nodes:

We conclude again that Chebyshev nodes are a very good choice for polynomial interpolation, as the growth in n is exponential for equidistant nodes.  However, those nodes are not optimal.

Convergence properties
It is natural to ask, for which classes of functions and for which interpolation nodes the sequence of interpolating polynomials converges to the interpolated function as ? Convergence may be understood in different ways, e.g. pointwise, uniform or in some integral norm.

The situation is rather bad for equidistant nodes, in that uniform convergence is not even guaranteed for infinitely differentiable functions. One classical example, due to Carl Runge, is the function f(x) = 1 / (1 + x2) on the interval . Another example is the function f(x) = |x| on the interval , for which the interpolating polynomials do not even converge pointwise except at the three points x = ±1, 0.

One might think that better convergence properties may be obtained by choosing different interpolation nodes. The following result seems to give a rather encouraging answer:

The defect of this method, however, is that interpolation nodes should be calculated anew for each new function f(x), but the algorithm is hard to be implemented numerically. Does there exist a single table of nodes for which the sequence of interpolating polynomials converge to any continuous function f(x)? The answer is unfortunately negative:

The proof essentially uses the lower bound estimation of the Lebesgue constant, which we defined above to be the operator norm of Xn (where Xn is the projection operator on Πn). Now we seek a table of nodes for which

Due to the Banach–Steinhaus theorem, this is only possible when norms of Xn are uniformly bounded, which cannot be true since we know that

For example, if equidistant points are chosen as interpolation nodes, the function from Runge's phenomenon demonstrates divergence of such interpolation. For better Chebyshev nodes, however, such an example is much harder to find due to the following result:

Related concepts
This problem is commonly resolved by the use of spline interpolation. Here, the interpolant is not a polynomial but a spline: a chain of several polynomials of a lower degree.

Interpolation of periodic functions by harmonic functions is accomplished by Fourier transform. This can be seen as a form of polynomial interpolation with harmonic base functions, see trigonometric interpolation and trigonometric polynomial.

Hermite interpolation problems are those where not only the values of the polynomial p at the nodes are given, but also all derivatives up to a given order. This turns out to be equivalent to a system of simultaneous polynomial congruences, and may be solved by means of the Chinese remainder theorem for polynomials. Birkhoff interpolation is a further generalization where only derivatives of some orders are prescribed, not necessarily all orders from 0 to a k.

Collocation methods for the solution of differential and integral equations are based on polynomial interpolation.

The technique of rational function modeling is a generalization that considers ratios of polynomial functions.

At last, multivariate interpolation for higher dimensions.

See also
 Newton series
 Polynomial regression

Notes

References

Further reading

External links 
 
 ALGLIB has an implementations in C++ / C#.
 GSL has a polynomial interpolation code in C
 Polynomial Interpolation demonstration.

Interpolation
Polynomials
Articles containing proofs